Henno Sepmann (12 February 1925 Tartu – 24 September 1985 Moscow) was an Estonian architect.

In 1952 he graduated from Tallinn Polytechnical Institute. Since 1952 he worked at the architectural bureau "Eesti Projekt". He was married to landscape architect Valve Pormeister.

Awards:
 1973: Estonian SSR merited architect

Works

 1960: Tallinn Song Festival Grounds (co-architect)
 1972: Viru Hotel (co-architect)

References

1925 births
1985 deaths
20th-century Estonian architects
Tallinn University of Technology alumni
People from Tartu
Burials at Metsakalmistu